Nanobagrus armatus is a species of bagrid catfish found in the Mahakam and Kapuas River basins of Borneo.

This species grows to a length of 3.2 cm and has a brown body with numerous cream-colored spots and 2 relatively large and irregular cream-colored patches on the sides of the body.

References 

Bagridae
Taxa named by Léon Vaillant
Fish described in 1902